The 2014 Women's Hockey Investec Cup was a women's field hockey tournament held at the Lee Valley Hockey and Tennis Centre. It took place between 9–13 July 2014 in London, England. A total of four teams competed for the title.

England won the tournament by defeating South Africa 2–1 in the final. Scotland won the bronze medal by defeating Wales 3–2 in the third and fourth playoff.

Teams

Results

Pool matches

Classification matches

Third and fourth place

Final

Statistics

Final standings

Goalscorers
4 Goals
 Alex Danson
3 Goals

 Vikki Bunce
 Kathleen Taylor

2 Goals

 Ellie Watton
 Nikki Lloyd
 Tarryn Bright
 Illse Davids
 Jade Mayne
 Emma Batten

1 Goal

 Giselle Ansley
 Sophie Bray
 Sam Quek 
 Kate Richardson-Walsh
 Susannah Townsend 
 Georgie Twigg
 Laura Unsworth
 Nicola White
 Ali Bell
 Nikki Kidd
 Catriona Ralph
 Ailsa Wyllie
 Dirkie Chamberlain
 Celia Evans
 Shelley Russell
 Eloise Laity
 Phoebe Richards

References

External links

2014
2014 in women's field hockey
International women's field hockey competitions hosted by England
International sports competitions in London
hockey
hockey
hockey
hockey